The French National Time Trial Championship is a road bicycle race that takes place inside the French National Cycling Championship, and decides the best cyclist in this type of race. The first edition took place in 1995. The first winner of the time trial championship was Thierry Marie. Jeannie Longo holds the record for the most wins with 11, and Sylvain Chavanel holds the record in the men's championship with 6. Bruno Armirail and Audrey Cordon-Ragot are the current champions.

Multiple winners

Men

Women

Men

Elite

U23

Women

Elite

See also
French National Road Race Championships
National Road Cycling Championships

References

External links
Past winners on cyclingarchives.com

National road cycling championships
Cycle races in France
Recurring sporting events established in 1995
1995 establishments in France
National championships in France